Sida Košutić (20 March 1902 – 13 May 1965) was a Croatian novelist, playwright, poet, essayist, literary critic, columnist, lector, and editor-in-chief of Croatian Women's Journal. She was one of the most important female figures of 20th century Croatian literature.

Life 
Košutić was the sister of Croatian politician August Košutić. She graduated pedagogy at the University of Zagreb. As one of the founders of the Croatian Writers' Association, Košutić's work was labeled as anti-governmental; after refusing to sign the capital punishment verdict at the show trial directed against Cardinal Stepinac in 1946, she was fired from the Croatian Publishing Institute.

Work 
Košutić was a lyricist, developing her fundamental idea of the aspiration of the human soul to God. Her poetry expressed Christian contemplative and metaphysical preoccupations, which is permeated with seeking a meaning in the mutual expression of love among men and God.  Her best lyrical works come in form of the prose poem (the dialogical collection of poems , 1927). Her patriotic poetry works are authentic and deprived of pathos.

She wrote for numerous periodicals, including literary revues, Catholic and Croatian emigrant periodicals.

References 

1902 births
1965 deaths
20th-century Croatian women writers
Croatian journalists
Croatian women journalists
Croatian columnists
Croatian women columnists
Croatian literary critics
Women literary critics
Croatian women essayists
Croatian women poets
Croatian dramatists and playwrights
Croatian novelists
Croatian women novelists
University of Zagreb alumni
20th-century journalists
Burials at Mirogoj Cemetery